Richard Pease may refer to:
 Sir Richard Pease, 4th Baronet (born 1958), British fund manager
 Sir Richard Pease, 3rd Baronet (1922–2021), British banker